Usman Bello Kumo is a Member of House of Representatives representing Akko federal constituency of Gombe State. He is the chairman of the House of Representatives Committee on Police Affairs, the same position he held in the Seventh Assembly and a former two times Chairman of Akko Local Government Area. He was born in Kumo, headquarters of the Akko Local Government Area.

Party membership 
Usman Bello Kumo is a member of the All Progressives Congres who among the six elected candidates of the APC's primary election for House of Representatives in Gombe State was the only one that got re-elected in the 2023 general election.

References 

Nigerian politicians
People from Gombe State
Year of birth missing (living people)
Living people